Edmund Heuberger (1883–1962) was a Swiss art director, screenwriter and film director.

Selected filmography

Screenwriter
 The Man Without Nerves (1924)
 The Fake Emir (1924)
 A Dangerous Game (1924)
 Adventure on the Night Express (1925)
 Swifter Than Death (1925)
The Black Pierrot (1926)
 Night of Mystery (1927)
 Affair at the Grand Hotel (1929)
 Bobby Gets Going (1931)

Director
 Lux, King of Criminals (1929)
 Distinguishing Features (1929)
 The Youths (1929)
 Yes, Yes, Women Are My Weakness (1929)
 Secret Police (1929)
 Witnesses Wanted (1930)
 Of Life and Death (1930)
 The Man in the Dark (1930)
 Das Menschlein Matthias (1941)

References

Bibliography
 Goble, Alan. The Complete Index to Literary Sources in Film. Walter de Gruyter, 1999.

External links

1883 births
1962 deaths
Swiss art directors
Swiss film directors
Swiss screenwriters
Male screenwriters
People from Aarau
20th-century screenwriters